Cinnamon Butte is a group of cinder cone volcanoes and lava domes in the Cascade Range of Oregon.  All of the vents are older than approximately 6,845 years as they are all covered in ash from the eruption of Mount Mazama.

Notable Vents

See also 

 List of volcanoes in the United States of America
 Cascade Volcanoes

References

External links 
 

Buttes of Oregon
Cinder cones of the United States
Lava domes
Subduction volcanoes
Cascade Volcanoes
Volcanoes of Oregon
Mountains of Oregon
Cascade Range
Landforms of Douglas County, Oregon
Mountains of Douglas County, Oregon